The Kouga Local Municipality council consists of thirty members elected by mixed-member proportional representation. Fifteen councillors are elected by first-past-the-post voting in fifteen wards, while the remaining fifteen are chosen from party lists so that the total number of party representatives is proportional to the number of votes received.

Results

December 2000 election

October 2002 floor crossing

In terms of the Eighth Amendment of the Constitution and the judgment of the Constitutional Court in United Democratic Movement v President of the Republic of South Africa and Others, in the period from 8–22 October 2002 councillors had the opportunity to cross the floor to a different political party without losing their seats. In the Kouga council, one councillor from the Democratic Alliance (DA) crossed to the New National Party (NNP), which had formerly been part of the DA, while the single councillor from Kouga 2000 crossed to the DA.

By-elections from October 2002 to August 2004
The following by-elections were held to fill vacant ward seats in the period between the floor crossing periods in October 2002 and September 2004.

September 2004 floor crossing
Another floor crossing period occurred on 1–15 September 2004, in which the NNP councillor and one DA councillor both crossed to the African National Congress (ANC).

By-elections from September 2004 to February 2006
The following by-elections were held to fill vacant ward seats in the period between the floor crossing period in September 2004 and the election in March 2006.

March 2006 election

By-elections from March 2006 to May 2011
The following by-elections were held to fill vacant ward seats in the period between the elections in March 2006 and May 2011.

May 2011 election

By-elections from May 2011 to August 2016
The following by-elections were held to fill vacant ward seats in the period between the elections in May 2011 and August 2016.

August 2016 election

By-elections from August 2016 to November 2021
The following by-elections were held to fill vacant ward seats in the period between the elections in August 2016 and November 2021.

November 2021 election

References

Municipal elections in South Africa
Elections in the Eastern Cape
Kouga Local Municipality